The Yalarnnga, also known as the Jalanga, are an Indigenous Australian people of the state of Queensland.

Language
Yalarnnga is an extinct Australian Aboriginal language, hypothesized to be one of the two Galgadungic languages of the Pama–Nyungan language family. The last native speaker died in 1980.

Country
They lived along the Burke and Mort Rivers and to the north of Chatsworth, and in the localities around Noranside and Buckingham Downs.

History of contact
The lands of the Yalarnnga were first occupied by white settlers in 1877, at which time their numbers were estimated to be around 200 people.

Alternative names
 Yellunga.
 Yelina.
 Wonganja. (putatively an extinct Yalarnnga horde)

Vocabulary
Some words from the Yalarnnga language, as spelt and written by Yalarnnga authors include:

 : good day
 Karlu / karlo: father
 Mernoo: mother
 Woothane: whiteman
 Kathirr: grass
 Karni: shoulder
 Katyimpa: two
 Kunyu: water
 Karrkuru: yellowbelly (fish)
 Monero: tame dog

Notes

Citations

Sources

Aboriginal peoples of Queensland